Christophoros Stamboglis is a Greek operatic bass.

Stamboglis was born in Athens, Greece. With The Royal Opera, he has sung Ramfis in Aida, Count Rodolfo in La sonnambula and Doctor Grenvil in La traviata. For the 2013/14 season, he will be singing Bartolo in Le nozze di Figaro.

References

Living people
21st-century Greek male opera singers
Operatic basses
Singers from Athens
20th-century Greek male opera singers
1963 births